The 2022 NCAA Division I Men's Swimming and Diving Championships were contested March 23–26, 2022 at the 98th annual NCAA-sanctioned swim meet to determine the team and individual national champions of Division I men's collegiate swimming and diving in the United States.

This year's events were hosted by the Georgia Institute of Technology at the McAuley Aquatic Center in Atlanta, Georgia.

Team standings
Note: Top 10 only
(H) = Hosts
(DC) = Defending champions
Full results

Swimming results

Diving results

See also
List of college swimming and diving teams

References

NCAA Division I Men's Swimming and Diving Championships
NCAA Division I Men's Swimming and Diving Championships
NCAA Division I Men's Swimming and Diving Championships